Metophthalmus is a genus of beetles in the family Latridiidae, containing the following species:

 Metophthalmus achilles Rücker & Reike, 2010
 Metophthalmus albosignatus Fall, 1899
 Metophthalmus americanus Motschulsky, 1866
 Metophthalmus asperatus Wollaston, 1854
 Metophthalmus bicolor Belon, 1895
 Metophthalmus capensis Belon, 1898
 Metophthalmus carinatus Otto, 1978
 Metophthalmus clareae Johnson, 1973
 Metophthalmus encaustus Wollaston, 1865
 Metophthalmus exiguus Wollaston, 1860
 Metophthalmus ferrugineus Wollaston, 1865
 Metophthalmus fulvus Reike & Rücker, 2010
 Metophthalmus genae Otto, 1978
 Metophthalmus haigi Andrews, 1976
 Metophthalmus hispanicus Reitter, 1908
 Metophthalmus hispidus Belon, 1895
 Metophthalmus humeridens Reitter, 1884
 Metophthalmus hungaricus Reitter, 1884
 Metophthalmus iviei Andrews, 1988
 Metophthalmus judaicus Sahlberg, 1913
 Metophthalmus kabylianus Chobaut, 1906
 Metophthalmus kanei Andrews, 1976
 Metophthalmus lacteolus Motschulsky, 1866
 Metophthalmus longipilis Otto, 1978
 Metophthalmus menelaos Rücker & Reike, 2010
 Metophthalmus muchmorei Andrews, 1988
 Metophthalmus niveicollis Jacquelin du Val, 1859
 Metophthalmus obscurus Reike & Rücker, 2010
 Metophthalmus occidentalis Israelson, 1984
 Metophthalmus parviceps LeConte, 1855
 Metophthalmus peringueyi Belon, 1898
 Metophthalmus proximus Reitter, 1908
 Metophthalmus raffrayi Belon, 1885
 Metophthalmus ragusae Reitter, 1875
 Metophthalmus rudis Fall, 1899
 Metophthalmus sandersoni Andrews, 1976
 Metophthalmus sculpturatus Wollaston, 1862
 Metophthalmus septemstriatus Hatch, 1962
 Metophthalmus solarii Binaghi, 1946
 Metophthalmus telemachos Rücker & Reike, 2010
 Metophthalmus trux Fall, 1899

References

Latridiidae genera